Serbian Land Forces provide aid in all cases of natural disasters deemed serious by the National Assembly of Serbia. Civil aid is outlined in the second pillar of the army mission statement.

Donations
During the gas disputes between Ukraine and Russia Serbia and its neighbors were left without natural gas for heating. Hours after the gas supply from Ukraine was announced to be cut, the 19th logistics battalion with the Army First Brigade donated and distributed heaters that use alternative sources of fuel. These heaters went to hospitals in Novi Sad.

United Nations Children's Fund
Chief of the Department for Training and Doctrine Major General Petar Cornakov presented the representatives of UNICEF program “School without Violence” a financial help which was collected by the members of Serbian Armed Forces and the Ministry of Defense. Approximately 290000 RSD ($6000 USD) donated will be used for implementing this project in “Djordje Natosevic” primary school in Novi Sad. Serbian Armed Forces support all similar campaigns where children get additional education and protection. In cooperation with other ministries and the team of experts, UNICEF has started a comprehensive program “School without violence” which provides the children and adults with necessary skills and knowledge to handle conflicts, for mitigating and cherishing the atmosphere of tolerance and understanding. This program is currently being implemented in 137 elementary schools in Serbia and has so far yielded good results-as it has helped create a safer and more secure environment where children learn, grow and develop their skills.

Military Medical Academy
Military Medical Academy is state-of-the-art military hospital found in Belgrade. The Serbian Armed Forces have voluntarily opened the hospital to all citizens of Serbia. The civilians are free to use the hospital on certain days of the week. During all other times the hospital is reserved for the military use.

Blood Drive
Serbian Armed Forces have organized a blood donation campaign on 28 May 2008 in order to boost the supply. According to the words of the head of the Blood Transfusion Institute of Serbia, Snezana Draskovic, in May 2008 the blood supply was below needed quantity.  Due to the blood donations of the Serbian Armed Forces the blood supplies have reached the needed amount.

Free medical assistance
Medical units of Serbian Armed Forces are providing free medical assistance and water supply in remoteAlbanian dominate villages of Presevo and Bujanovac municipalities in South Serbia. Military doctors have recently visited villages of Mali Trnovac and Trstena. The reaction of the mayor of Mali Trnovac, Sabri Jukupi, as well as the inhabitants has been positive.  For example, the mayor has extended “his gratitude to soldiers of the Serbian Armed Forces” and has stated that the medicine received has been very important to his family.
during winter training.

Surgical emergencies
Lieutenant Colonel Goran Stankovic of the Serbian Armed Forces, states the example from a year and a half ago when a 15-year-old boy Jeton Malici from Presevo was helping his father in the woods in cutting down trees and accidentally hurt his leg with a chain saw. His father Skender brought him to the local military base Cvore. Captain First Class Jovica Bosanac provided first aid to the boy and then ordered that a military medical vehicle transport the boy to Presevo. After the boy had recovered, Jeton’s father brought sweets and refreshments for the soldiers and commanders. The members of 78th motorized brigade due to the inaccessibility of the terrain had to dig out 1.1 km long water canal.

Road construction
Unit of the 78th motorized brigade are credited for the construction of many roads. For example, the villagers of Muhovac, a remote village that is predominantly Albanian in South Serbia was inaccessible by cars before the 78th motorized brigade built the road. Another project in Trniste municipality where the unit has cleared several kilometers of roads that was mostly inaccessible.
The Serbian Armed Force members have repaired an  road from Bujici to Ranitovac village, which earned them the gratitude of the local Albanian community. In addition, the military has built a road to a local mosque in South Serbia in the village of Ilince.

Unexploded missile cleanup
161 depleted uranium missiles have been recovered in southern Serbia yet no recovery has been made in Kosovo due to the legal restrictions on the Serbian army. The missiles were left in Reljan, near Presevo after the 1999 NATO bombing campaign. During the 78-day air strikes on Serbia's predecessor Yugoslavia in 1999, the NATO dropped 31,000 missiles and bombs containing depleted uranium, a kind of radioactive toxic material that has been linked to Gulf War syndrome and spiraling levels of cancer and birth deformities in Iraq. In Kosovo, the NATO has identified some 112 sites where it acknowledges using depleted uranium munitions. NATO has not given the government in Belgrade a comprehensive list of the bombing sites. The army cleanup operation in Reljan cleared all of the 12 hectares of contaminated grounds within months. A total of 2.4 cubic meters of contaminated soil has also been collected and removed. The Serbian government has funded the cleanup operation in the Reljan site with €350,000 (US$450,000).

References 

Military of Serbia